Ebrahima 'Ibou' Sawaneh (born 7 September 1986) is a football striker from The Gambia who is currently playing for City Pirates in the Belgian Division 2. In the past he played for various clubs, including Lech Poznan, KSK Beveren, KV Kortrijk, KV Mechelen, RAEC Mons, OH Leuven and Muaither.

Ebrahima Sawaneh has a double nationality (Gambian-German), but makes his appearance for the Gambia national football team.

Career
On 3 February 2014 Ibou Sawaneh returned to his parent club OH Leuven after a four-month loan spell in Qatar at Muaither SC.

In January 2019, Ibou joined Titus Pétange in Luxembourg on a half-year contract. He left the club at the end of his contract in July 2019, having played 13 league games and scored 7 goals.

References

External links 

1986 births
Living people
Gambian footballers
German footballers
Lech Poznań players
Lech Poznań II players
K.S.K. Beveren players
K.V. Kortrijk players
K.V. Mechelen players
R.A.E.C. Mons players
Oud-Heverlee Leuven players
S.K. Beveren players
Muaither SC players
K.S.V. Roeselare players
A.F.C. Tubize players
Union Titus Pétange players
Ekstraklasa players
Belgian Pro League players
Challenger Pro League players
Luxembourg National Division players
Belgian Third Division players
The Gambia international footballers
People from Serekunda
Expatriate footballers in Poland
Expatriate footballers in Belgium
Expatriate footballers in Luxembourg
German expatriate sportspeople in Poland
Gambian expatriate sportspeople in Poland
German expatriate sportspeople in Belgium
Gambian expatriate sportspeople in Belgium
German expatriate sportspeople in Qatar
Gambian expatriate footballers
Association football forwards
Qatar Stars League players
German expatriate sportspeople in Luxembourg
Gambian expatriate sportspeople in Luxembourg
Gambian expatriate sportspeople in Qatar